Adon Gomis (born 19 July 1992) is a footballer who plays as a defender for  club Paris 13 Atletico. Born in France, he plays for the Guinea-Bissau national team.

Club career
Gomis made his professional debut with Dunkerque in a 1-0 Ligue 2 win over Toulouse FC on 22 August 2020.

On 28 January 2023, Gomis joined Paris 13 Atletico in Championnat National.

International career
Born in France, Gomis is of Senegalese and Bissau-Guinean descent. He debuted with Guinea-Bissau in a friendly 3–0 win over Equatorial Guinea on 23 March 2022.

References

External links
 
 Foot National Profile

1992 births
Living people
Sportspeople from Évreux
Bissau-Guinean footballers
Guinea-Bissau international footballers
French footballers
Bissau-Guinean people of Senegalese descent
French sportspeople of Bissau-Guinean descent
French sportspeople of Senegalese descent
Citizens of Guinea-Bissau through descent
Association football defenders
AS Poissy players
Cergy Pontoise FC players
Stade Lavallois players
USL Dunkerque players
Paris 13 Atletico players
Ligue 2 players
Championnat National players
Championnat National 3 players
Sportspeople of Senegalese descent
Footballers from Normandy
Black French sportspeople